Bhamba Kalan is a town and Union Council of Kasur District in the Punjab province of Pakistan. It is part of Kasur Tehsil and is located at 31°11'21N 74°12'8E with an altitude of 203 metres (669 feet).

References

Kasur District